Hafling is an Italian comune (municipality) and home of the famous Haflinger horse.

Geography

Hafling borders the following municipalities: Merano, Sarntal, Schenna and Vöran.

History

The city gave its name to the Haflinger breed of horses.

Coat of arms
The emblem is a natural breed Haflinger horse, on a mountain with three vert peaks, through a pine tree. The mountain and the pine symbolize that the village is located at high elevation. The coat of arms was granted in 1967.

Society

Linguistic distribution
According to the 2011 census, 97.58% of the population spoke German, 2.42% Italian as first language.

References

External links 

 Official website 

Municipalities of South Tyrol